Yokotani is a surname. Notable people with the surname include:

Masahiro Yokotani (born 1964), Japanese screenwriter
Masaki Yokotani (born 1952), Japanese footballer
Shigeru Yokotani (born 1987), Japanese footballer

See also
Yoko Tani

Japanese-language surnames